The 1956 Colorado gubernatorial election was held on November 6, 1956. Democratic nominee Stephen McNichols defeated Republican nominee Donald G. Brotzman with 51.34% of the vote.

Primary elections
Primary elections were held on September 11, 1956.

Democratic primary

Candidates
Stephen McNichols, incumbent Lieutenant Governor

Results

Republican primary

Candidates
Donald G. Brotzman, State Senator

Results

General election

Candidates
Stephen McNichols, Democratic
Donald G. Brotzman, Republican

Results

References

1956
Colorado
Gubernatorial